The Brookville BL36PH is a four-axle diesel-electric locomotive for commuter trains, produced by Brookville Equipment Corporation. It was the first North American passenger locomotive designed with a 20-cylinder engine since the EMD SDP45 and EMD FP45, originally built in the 1960s. The outer shell of the locomotive was designed by Cesar Vergara, who has also designed several other North American passenger locomotives, including the MPI MPXpress, the GE Genesis, the MPI HSP46 and the EMD F59PHI.

Tri-Rail, a Florida commuter rail service operated by the South Florida Regional Transportation Authority, is so far the only customer, with an initial order for 10 locomotives, later expanded to 12.

, the locomotive is still listed as an available product on Brookville’s website, although no contracts have been awarded since 2011, and the current Tier 3 design is no longer legal for sale in the United States.

References

External links 
 
 
 Specification Sheet
 Tractive effort curve on page 9.

B-B locomotives
Diesel-electric locomotives of the United States
EPA Tier 3-compliant locomotives of the United States
Brookville locomotives
Standard gauge locomotives of the United States
Passenger locomotives
Railway locomotives introduced in 2012